Tangsir (also transliterated as Tangseer, in Persian: تنگسیر) is a Persian novel written by Iranian writer Sadeq Chubak. Tangsir was the author's first novel. The book recounts the valorous acts of the fighters of Tangestan (a region near Bushehr province).

Background
Chubak was a translator of western novels and stories into Persian. Before writing Tangsir. The author translated books including Pinocchio and some of Eugene O'Neill's plays. Tangsirs events have really occurred in Bushehr in the past. Rasoul Parvizi, an Iranian writer wrote a short story in his 1957 short story collection, The Patched Pants (in Persian: شلوارهای وصله‌دار) named Shir Mohammad (the name of the hero of the Tangsir novel) and Chubak had been influenced by that story.

Characters
Za'er Mohammad
Shahrou
Karim Haj Hamzeh
Mohammad Gondeh Rajab 
Agha Ali Kachal
Asatour the Armenian
Nayeb

Film Adaptation

In 1974, Iranian director, Amir Naderi directed a film of the same name based on the novel. Among the actors were  Behruz Vosoughi, Nuri Kasrai, Parviz Fanizadeh, and Enayat Bakhshi.

References

1963 novels
Iranian novels
Persian-language novels
Novels set in Iran
Novels by Sadeq Chubak